Jane Rosenthal (born September 21, 1956) is an American film producer. She is co-founder, CEO, and executive chair of Tribeca Enterprises, a media company that encompasses Tribeca Productions, the Tribeca Film Festival, Tribeca Studios, and non-profit offshoot the Tribeca Film Institute. She and Robert De Niro founded the Tribeca Film Festival in the aftermath of the September 11 attacks to help revitalize downtown Manhattan.

She has been De Niro's producing partner since 1988, producing films including Wag the Dog (1997), Meet the Parents (2000), and The Good Shepherd (2006). In 2020, Rosenthal was nominated for the Academy Award for Best Picture for producing The Irishman (2019).

Biography
In 1989, Rosenthal co-founded the Tribeca Productions film studio in the lower Manhattan neighborhood of TriBeCa with actor Robert De Niro. Rosenthal and De Niro co-produced the dramatic television anthology series TriBeCa in 1993 and, in 2002, co-organized the first annual TriBeCa Film Festival.

She is co-founder and co-chair of the board of the not-for-profit Tribeca Film Institute.

Rosenthal is a member of the Academy of Motion Pictures Arts and Sciences and has been honored by The Museum of the Moving Image, New York University Tisch School of Arts, The Matrix Award, and The National September 11 Memorial & Museum. In 2011, she was presented with the Jane Jacobs Medal for Lifetime Leadership from The Rockefeller Foundation and The Monteblanc de la Culture Arts Patronage Award for her commitment to arts and culture. Rosenthal serves on the boards of the National September 11 Memorial & Museum, The Child Mind Institute, Global Citizen, and interactive media company Eko.

Personal life

In 1995, Rosenthal married Craig Hatkoff. They raised their two children in the Jewish faith. The couple separated in 2014.

Filmography

Producer
 Thunderheart (1992)
 Night and the City (1992)
 A Bronx Tale (1993)
 Faithful (1996)
 Marvin's Room (1996)
 Wag the Dog (1997)
 Analyze This (1999)
 Entropy (1999)
 Flawless (1999)
 The Adventures of Rocky and Bullwinkle (2000)
 Meet the Parents (2000)
 Prison Song (2001)
 Showtime (2002)
 About a Boy (2002)
 Analyze That (2002)
 House of D (2004)
 Stage Beauty (2004)
 Meet the Fockers (2004)
 Rent (2005)
 The Good Shepherd (2006)
 What Just Happened (2008)
 Little Fockers (2010)
 All We Had (2016)
 The Irishman (2019)
 The Good House (2021)

Executive producer

Special thanks
 Café Society (2015)
 Sign Gene (2017)
 Nigerian Prince (2018)
 Lucky Grandma (2019)

References

External links
 Featuring Jane Rosenthal – Crain's 100 Most Influential Women in NYC Business
 
 Tribeca Film Festival – Official website

Living people
Film producers from New York (state)
20th-century American Jews
Brown University alumni
Film festival founders
New York University alumni
Businesspeople from New York City
Businesspeople from Providence, Rhode Island
American women film producers
1956 births
21st-century American Jews
20th-century American women
21st-century American women